This is the complete list of songs recorded by Memphis Minnie, in alphabetical order.

A–C
"A Little Too Late"

"After While Blues"

"Ain't No Use Tryin' to Tell On Me (I Know Something on You)"

"Ain't Nobody Home but Me"

"Bad Outside Friends"

"Ball and Chain Blues"

"Banana Man Blues"

"Beat It Right"

"Black Cat Blues"

"Black Rat Swing"

"Black Widow Stinger"

"Blue Monday Blues"

"Blues Everywhere"

"Botherin' That Thing"

"Boy Friend Blues"

"Broken Heart"

"Bumble Bee"

"Call the Fire Wagon"

"Can I Do It for You"

"Can't Afford to Lose My Man"

"Caught Me Wrong Again"

"Cherry Ball Blues"

"Chickasaw Train Blues (Low Down Dirty Thing)"

"Conjur Man"

"Crazy Cryin' Blues"

D–F
"Daybreak Blues"

"Dirty Dauber Blues"

"Dirty Mother for You"

"Doctor, Doctor Blues"

"Don't Lead My Baby Wrong"

"Don't Turn the Card"

"Don't Want No Woman"

"Down by the Riverside"

"Down Home Girl"

"Down in New Orleans"

"Down in the Alley"

"Dragging My Heart Around"

"Drunken Barrel House Blues"

"Ethel Bea"

"Fashion Plate Daddy"

"Fingerprint Blues"

"Fish Man Blues"

"Fishin' Blues"

"Frankie Jean (That Trottin' Fool)"

"'Frisco Town"

G–I
"Garage Fire Blues"

"Georgia Skin"

"Give It to Me in My Hand (Can I Go Home with You)"

"Goin' Back to Texas"

"Good Biscuits"

"Good Morning"

"Good Soppin'"

"Got to Leave You No. 1"

"Got to Leave You No. 2"

"Grandpa and Grandma Blues"

"Has Anyone Seen My Man?"

"He's in the Ring (Doing That Same Old Thing)"

"Hold Me Blues"

"Hole in the Wall"

"Hoodoo Lady"

"Hot Stuff"

"Hustlin' Woman Blues"

"I Am Sailin'"

"I Called You This Morning"

"I Don't Want No Woman I Have to Give My Money To"

"I Don't Want That Junk Outa You"

"I Don't Want You No More"

"I Got To Make a Change Blues"

"I Hate to See the Sun Go Down"

"I Hope Love Will Change Some Day"

"I Never Told a Lie"

"Ice Man Blues"

"Ice Man (Come On Up)"

"I'd Rather See Him Dead"

"If You See My Rooster (Please Run Him Home)"

"I'm a Bad Luck Woman"

"I'm a Gambling Woman"

"I'm Going Back Home"

"I'm Going Don't You Know"

"I'm Gonna Bake My Biscuits"

"I'm Not a Bad Gal"

"I'm So Glad"

"I'm Talking About You"

"I'm Waiting On You"

"I'm Wild About My Stuff"

"In Love Again"

"In My Girlish Days"

"It Was You, Baby"

"It's Hard to Be Mistreated"

"It's Hard to Please My Man"

"I've Been Treated Wrong"

J–L
"Jailhouse Trouble Blues"

"Jockey Man Blues"

"Joe Louis Strut"

"Joliet Bound"

"Jump Little Rabbit"

"Keep It to Yourself"

"Keep On Eatin'"

"Keep On Goin'"

"Keep On Sailin'"

"Keep Your Big Mouth Shut"

"Kid Man Blues"

"Kind Treatment Blues"

"Killer Diller Blues"

"Killer Diller from the South"

"Kissing in the Dark"

"Lake Michigan"

"Lean Meat Won't Fry"

"Let Me Ride" 	

"Let's Go to Town"

"Living the Best I Can"

"Long As I Can See You Smile"

"Look What You Got"

"Looking the World Over"

"Lonesome Shack Blues"

"Love Come and Go"

"Low Down Man Blues"

M–O
"Ma Rainey"

"Man, You Won't Give Me No Money"

"Me and My Chauffeur Blues"

"Mean Mistreater Blues"

"Memphis Minnie-Jitis Blues"

"Meningitis Blues"

"Million Dollar Blues"

"Moaning the Blues"

"Moonshine"

"Mr. Tango Blues"

"My Baby Don't Want Me No More"

"My Black Buffalo"

"My Butcher Man"

"My Gage Is Going Up"

"My Man Is Gone Again"

"My Mary Blues"

"My Strange Man"

"My Wash Woman's Gone"

"New Bumble Bee Blues"

"New Caught Me Wrong Again"

"New Dirty Dozen"

"New Orleans Stop Time"

"Night Watchmen Blues"

"North Memphis Blues"

"Nothing in Rambling"

"Oh, Believe Me"

"Out in the Cold"

P–R
"Pickin' the Blues"

"Pig Meat on the Line"

"Pile Driving Blues"

"Please Don't Stop Him"

"Please Set a Date"

"Plymouth Rock Blues"

"Poor and Wandering Woman Blues"

"Preacher's Blues"

"Reachin' Pete"

"Remember Me Blues"

"Running and Dodging Blues"

S–T
"Selling My Pork Chops"

"She Put Me Outdoors"

"She Wouldn't Give Me None"

"Shout the Boogie"

"Soo Cow Soo"

"Squat It"

"Stinging Snake Blues"

"Stop Lying to Me"

"Sweet Man"

"Sylvester and His Mule Blues"

"That Will Be Allright"

"The Man I Love"

"The Saint"

"This Is Your Last Chance Baby"

"Three Times Seven Blues"

"Today Today Blues"

"Tonight I Smile with You"

"Too Late"

"True Love"

W–Y
"Walking and Crying Blues"

"Wants Cake When I'm Hungry"

"Weary Woman's Blues"

"Western Union"

"What a Night"

"What Fault You Find of Me? Part 1"

"What Fault You Find of Me? Part 2"

"What's the Matter with the Mill?"

"When My Man Comes Home"

"When the Levee Breaks"

"When the Saints Go Marching Home"

"When the Sun Goes Down"

"When You Love Me"

"When You're Asleep"

"Where Is My Good Man"

"Why Did I Make You Cry"

"World of Trouble"

"Worried Baby Blues"

"You Can't Give It Away"

"You Got to Get Out of Here"

"You Got to Move"

"You Need a Friend"

"You Wrecked My Happy Home"

References
https://www.amazon.com/Memphis-Minnie/e/B000APVKTA/works/ref=ntt_mus_teaser?
http://www.discogs.com/artist/Memphis+Minnie#p=1&t=Releases_All
http://sundayblues.org/archives/2593

Memphis Minnie